Shelley Hughes (born January 6, 1958, in Canton, Ohio) is an American politician and a Republican member of the Alaska Senate, serving since 2017. Hughes was previously a member of the Alaska House of Representatives from January 18, 2013, until January 22, 2017, representing District F.

Career 
Hughes has an AA from Cuyahoga Community College and a BA from the University of Alaska.

Alaska House of Representatives 
Hughes was elected to the Alaska House of Representatives in 2012, beating Daniel Hamm in the primary.

Alaska Senate 
Hughes was first elected to the Alaska Senate in its 2016 election. In 2021, she was chosen to be the majority leader of the Alaska Senate.

Health care 
In September 2021, Hughes was part of a panel of Alaska legislators focused on health care. Hughes argued that Alaska was "the highest cost location on the globe" for the cost of drug and medical treatment, and said she was looking at pharmacy benefit management and increased price transparency as ways to keep costs down.

Transgender athletes 
In May 2021, Hughes introduced a bill into the Alaska Senate that would ban transgender women and girls from playing in women's sports. The bill required that public schools, or private schools with teams that compete against public schools, have gender-segregated sporting teams and that any participant on the girls' team "must be female, based on the participant's biological sex." Because the bill was introduced in the final few weeks of the legislative session, Hughes announced that she would push for it in the next legislative session instead.

Personal life 
Hughes' husband, Roger, is a veteran of the Vietnam War. She has four children.

Electoral history

2020

2016

2014

2012

References

1958 births
21st-century American politicians
21st-century American women politicians
Living people
Republican Party Alaska state senators
Republican Party members of the Alaska House of Representatives
Politicians from Canton, Ohio
People from Palmer, Alaska
University of Alaska Anchorage alumni
Women state legislators in Alaska